Radloff is a surname. Notable people with the surname include:

Frank Kenneth Radloff (1916–1995), merchant and political figure in Saskatchewan
Friedrich Wilhelm Radloff (1837–1918), German-born Russian founder of Turkology, a scientific study of Turkic peoples
Stan Radloff (1919–2009), former Australian rules footballer
Toby Radloff (born 1957), former file clerk who appears in Cleveland writer Harvey Pekar's comic book American Splendor
Wayne Radloff (born 1961), former professional American football offensive lineman

See also
Toibb v. Radloff, 501 U.S. 157 (1991)
Radl (disambiguation)
Rado (disambiguation)
Roff (disambiguation)